Arnoliseus is a genus of Brazilian jumping spiders (family Salticidae) that was first described by A. Braul in 2002. , it contained five species, found only in Brazil.

Species
, the World Spider Catalog accepted five species:
Arnoliseus calcarifer (Simon, 1902) (type species) – Brazil
Arnoliseus carioca Baptista, Castanheira, Oliveira & do Prado, 2020 – Brazil
Arnoliseus falcatus Baptista, Castanheira, Oliveira & do Prado, 2020 – Brazil
Arnoliseus graciosa Braul & Lise, 2002 – Brazil
Arnoliseus hastatus Baptista, Castanheira, Oliveira & do Prado, 2020 – Brazil

References

Salticidae genera
Salticidae
Spiders of Brazil